Darley Dale is a civil parish in the Derbyshire Dales district of Derbyshire, England. The parish contains 27 listed buildings that are recorded in the National Heritage List for England. Of these, three are listed at Grade II*, the middle of the three grades, and the others are at Grade II, the lowest grade.  The parish contains the town of Darley Dale and the surrounding area.  Most of the listed buildings are houses, cottages and associated structures, farmhouses and farm buildings.  The other listed buildings include a church and its former rectory, a road bridge over the River Derwent, public houses, a mile post and a milestone, buildings associated with Darley Dale railway station, an institute, and a school.


Key

Buildings

References

Citations

Sources

 

Lists of listed buildings in Derbyshire